The 2023 Texas A&M Aggies football team will represent Texas A&M University in the 2023 NCAA Division I FBS football season. The Aggies play their home games at Kyle Field in College Station, Texas, and will compete in the Western Division of the Southeastern Conference (SEC). They will be led by  Jimbo Fisher in his sixth year as the team's head coach.

Previous Year

Transfer Portal

Outgoing Transfers

Incoming Transfers

Schedule
Texas A&M and the SEC announced the 2023 football schedule on September 20, 2022. The 2023 Aggies' schedule consists of 7 home games, 3 away games, and 1 neutral site game for the regular season. Texas A&M will host four SEC conference opponents Alabama, Auburn, Mississippi State and South Carolina at home and will travel to four SEC opponents, LSU (rivalry), Ole Miss, and Tennessee and will face Arkansas (rivalry) at AT&T Stadium in Arlington, Texas to close out the SEC regular season on the road. Texas A&M is not scheduled to play SEC East opponents Florida, Georgia, Kentucky, Missouri and Vanderbilt in the 2023 regular season. The Aggies' bye week comes during week 8 (on October 21, 2023).

Texas A&M's out of conference opponents represent the ACC, Mountain West, Sun Belt and the WAC conferences. The Aggies will host three non–conference games which are against Abilene Christian from the WAC (FCS), Louisiana–Monroe from the Sun Belt and New Mexico from the Mountain West and will travel to Miami (FL) from the ACC.

References

Texas AandM
Texas A&M Aggies football seasons
Texas AandM Aggies football